Zlata is a female given name of South Slavic origin meaning "golden". It is common amongst all South Slavic countries in the Balkans, such as  Bosnia and Herzegovina, Bulgaria, Croatia, North Macedonia and Serbia. The name is popular in Bosnia because it is considered ethnically neutral amongst the three dominant Bosnian ethnicities: Bosniaks, Serbs and Croats. The name is derived from the South Slavic word zlato - from the Old Slavic root zolto (gold).

Notable people with the name include:

Zlata Adamovská (born 1959), Czech actress
Zlata Bartl (1920–2008), Bosnian scientist 
Zlata Bizova (born 1927), Russian painter
Zlata Filipović (born 1980), Bosnian writer 
Zlata Kolarić-Kišur (1894–1990), Croatian writer
Zlata Ognevich (born 1986), Ukrainian singer and politician
Zlata of Maglen (died 1795), Bulgarian saint
Zlata Petković (1954–2012), Serbian actress
Zlata Petrović (born 1962), Serbian singer
Zlata Razdolina (born 1959), Russian musician
Zlata Sarafova (born 1879), Bulgarian public figure

See also
Slavic names

Slavic feminine given names
Bosnian feminine given names
Serbian feminine given names
Feminine given names